Prince Polo is a Polish wafer chocolate bar and one of Poland's top-selling candy brands. It is also sold in the Czech Republic, Slovakia, Hungary, Lithuania and Ukraine under the name Siesta, and in Iceland under Prins Póló. According to measurements shown by Nielsen, the bar has been the most sold chocolate bar for decades in Iceland and was for many years one of the few chocolate bars available in the country.

Prince Polo was introduced in 1955, during the early years of the Polish People's Republic, by Olza S.A. in Cieszyn. It is a chocolate-covered wafer, with four layers of wafer joined by three layers of chocolate-flavored filling; it was easily identifiable by its metallic gold-colored wrapper.

The company, which was founded in 1920, was purchased by Kraft Jacobs Suchard in 1993. In 1995 the Prince Polo packaging was revised with a new logo; the bar was no longer wrapped in paper and was instead sealed in plastic. Subsequently, several new varieties of Prince Polo were introduced, beginning with Hazelnut (Orzechowy) in 1996, and later milk chocolate, coconut, and Premium (claimed to be a more luxurious version). A larger XXL (52 g) size was also added.

In popular culture
 Prins Póló was an Icelandic indie-pop band/solo project/moniker of Svavar Pétur Eysteinsson, member of Icelandic alternative-rock band Skakkamanage.
 "Prins Póló" is an Icelandic song by Sumargleðin performed by Magnús Ólafsson, where he is nicknamed Prins Póló because of his love for the chocolate bar.

See also
 Krówki, literally "little cows," are Polish fudge, semi-soft milk toffee candies.
 List of Polish desserts

References

External links
Prince Polo Iceland website

Chocolate bars
Polish desserts
Cieszyn
Mondelez International brands
Polish brands
Brand name chocolate